The 2015 season for the  road cycling team began in January at the Tour Down Under. As a UCI WorldTeam, they were automatically invited and obligated to send a squad to every event in the UCI World Tour.

In June 2014 it was announced that Belkin would stop sponsoring the cycling team. On July 20, 2014, the team announced they had an agreement in place with the Brand Loyalty skating team. A day later, the team also released the news that the Dutch Lotto will also sponsor the team. On September 29, 2014, the contracts were signed between the two teams, meaning that the new name would be TEAMLottoNL, with the renaming taking effect from 1 January 2015. On October 23, 2014, the team was unveiled in Utrecht as Team LottoNL–Jumbo showing their new black and yellow team kit. Lotto had previously been confirmed as the team's title sponsor, supermarket chain, Jumbo, was presented as the second sponsor of the WorldTour team.

Team roster

Riders who joined the team for the 2015 season

Riders who left the team during or after the 2014 season

Season victories

National, Continental and World champions 2015

References

External links
 

2015 road cycling season by team
2015
2015 in Dutch sport